GaffneyCline is a global consultancy in the energy sector, providing techno-commercial advice to clients that include energy producers, financial institutions, governments, etc. GaffneyCline is an independent wholly-owned subsidiary of Baker Hughes.

One of the notable functions of GaffneyCline, along with similar petroleum industry consultants such as DeGolyer and MacNaughton, Netherland, Sewell, RPS-APA and Ryder Scott, is to provide third-party verification and/or valuation of oil and natural gas reserves - typically 1P proven reserves, but also 2P probable reserves and 3P possible reserves - for company annual reports and SEC filing 20-F. In addition to commercial and technical studies in the oil and gas sector, GaffneyCline has expertise in Carbon Management, more specifically CCUS, hydrogen, carbon intensity estimation and abatement.

History 
Peter Gaffney and Ben Cline, both petroleum engineers working in oil and gas in South America, found they both shared a dream to have their own consultancy. They believed that the oil and gas industry could benefit from independent technical and management expertise, such as suggestions on how to improve production, where to drill and how to be more efficient. In 1962 they founded Gaffney, Cline & Associates (GaffneyCline) in Trinidad, establishing what would become a leading international oil and gas consultancy with offices in Houston, London, Singapore, Buenos Aires, Sydney and Russia.

While actively trying to secure clients and contracts, the founders developed the ideas and principles that would guide the success of the company going forward: excellence, effort and integrity. They also felt that GaffneyCline must be present in the growing regions and basins that were strategic for the industry and could offer rounded technical, operational and commercial expertise. 

In the mid 1960s, GaffneyCline expanded into the United Kingdom with a view to use the rapidly developing North Sea as a springboard for growth. Further expansion in Singapore would follow in the late 1960s to capitalize on growth in crucial Asia Pacific markets (particularly Indonesia), which had become focus investment areas for major and independent oil companies. The late 1970s would see GaffneyCline increase market penetration throughout the Americas and internationally in every major hydrocarbon region around the world.

In 2001, GaffneyCline received The Queen's Award for Enterprise: International Trade (Export) for consultancy services to the energy industry.

GaffneyCline has continued to expand in recent years, forging a presence in the world’s energy transition. GaffneyCline is able to build on its oil and gas expertise by performing technical, commercial and strategic assessments of carbon and climate risks and opportunities addressing each stage of the carbon lifecycle. 

Since 2008, GaffneyCline has been a subsidiary of Baker Hughes.

Awards 
 Queen's Award for Export Achievement 1993
 Queen's Award for Export Achievement 2001

Notable Employees  
 Peter Gaffney - Co-founder of GaffneyCline, 1988 Distinguished Lecturer and 1996 President of the Society of Petroleum Engineers
 Paul Worthington - 2001 Distinguished Lecturer of the Society of Petroleum Engineers
 Andrew Young - 2002 President of the Society of Petroleum Engineers
 Doug Peacock - 2010 Distinguished Lecturer of the Society of Petroleum Engineers
 David Waldo - 2014 Distinguished Lecturer of the Society of Petroleum Engineers
 Nathan Meehan - 2016 President of the Society of Petroleum Engineers
 Rawdon Seager - 2023 Distinguished Lecturer of the Society of Petroleum Engineers
 Richard Pike - Former Chief Executive of the Royal Society of Chemistry
 Tarek Ahmed - Author of "Reservoir Engineering Handbook"

See also 
 DeGolyer and MacNaughton

References

External links 

Energy consultancies
Design companies established in 1962
Energy companies established in 1962
British companies established in 1962
Energy companies of the United Kingdom
Petroleum industry
Consulting firms of the United Kingdom
Research and analysis firms of the United Kingdom